Sociedade União 1º Dezembro is a sports club from Sintra, Portugal. The football section of the club was founded on 6 April 1938 and the women's football section in 1995. The women's football team played in the top national league, the Campeonato Nacional de Futebol Feminino and were the dominant force during the 2000s. After the first league title in 1999–2000, the team won every league title from the 2001–02 season until 2011–12. The team had won 7 Portuguese Cups since the creation of the competition in 2003–2004, making it the most successful women's football team in Portugal. However, at the end of 2013–2014, the women's football team ended due to economic issues.

History
The women's football section of the Sociedade União 1º de Dezembro was created in 1995, making the club one of the few in Portugal to have both a men's and a women's football team. Ever since the creation of the section, the team have won 12 league titles – 11 of which in a row – and 7 Portuguese Cups making it the most successful women's football team in Portugal.

The section also managed an U-18 women's football team which disputed the Campeonato de Promoção de Futebol Feminino, the name of the women's football second division.

After a 3rd place in the 2012-13 league, the women's football section was incorporated into Sevenfoot, a non-profit association managing the youth football teams of the club. This restructuring involved several players of the main team leaving the club, changing the manager and making the U-18 team into a 7-a-side team to challenge for the new Lisbon U-18 Regional League.

Titles 
Main Team
 Portuguese Women's Champion 
Winners (12) (record): 1999-2000, 2001-02, 2002-03, 2003-04, 2004-05, 2005-06, 2006-07, 2007-08, 2008-09, 2009-10, 2010-11, 2011-2012
 Portuguese Women's Cup
Winners (7) (record): 2003-04, 2005-06, 2006-07, 2007-08, 2009-10, 2010-11, 2011-12

U-18 Team
 Second Division Cup
Winner (1): 2012-13

Record in UEFA competitions

Final squad

As of 3 November 2013

References

External links 
 
 
 Team Page at Zerozero.pt

Women's football clubs in Portugal
Association football clubs established in 1995
1995 establishments in Portugal
2014 disestablishments in Portugal
S.U. 1º Dezembro
Campeonato Nacional de Futebol Feminino teams